The High Speed Rail (West Midlands – Crewe) Bill Select Committee is a select committee of the House of Commons in the Parliament of the United Kingdom. The Committee was established in 2018 with a remit to provide persons and bodies the opportunity to suggest amendments to the bill.

Membership 
As of 31 March 2019, the members of the committee are as follows:

See also 
 Parliamentary Committees of the United Kingdom

References

External links 
High Speed Rail (West Midlands - Crewe) Bill Select Committee

Select Committees of the British House of Commons